José E. "Kiko" Avilés Santiago is a Puerto Rican politician and past mayor of Moca. Avilés is affiliated with the New Progressive Party (PNP) and has served as mayor since 2001.

References

Living people
Mayors of places in Puerto Rico
New Progressive Party (Puerto Rico) politicians
People from Moca, Puerto Rico
Year of birth missing (living people)